The NBA Development League Team Executive of the Year is an annual NBA Development League (D-League) award given since the 2009–10 season to the top front office executive involved in team operations. The award is determined by peer voting and teams are not allowed to vote for themselves. Jon Jennings, the President and General Manager of the Maine Red Claws, was the inaugural winner. He was recognized for leading a team that sold out its inaugural season, led the league in merchandise sales and ticket revenue, and was among the top teams in sponsorship revenue.

Winners

See also
NBA Executive of the Year Award

References

National Basketball Association lists
Executive of the year
Awards established in 2010